Maungawhau railway station, commonly known as Mount Eden railway station, is a Western Line station of the Auckland railway network in the Auckland suburb of Mount Eden in New Zealand. The station is has been closed since 2020 and is currently undergoing an extensive reconstruction as part of the wider work on the City Rail Link. The station is due to reopen to the public in early 2026.

The reconstruction work is adding two side platforms on the City Rail Link line toward Karanga-a-Hape railway station in addition to the island platform on the line towards Grafton station. The station was reached via a footbridge from Mount Eden Road or from the level crossing between Ngahura Street and Fenton Street.

History 
 1880: Opened as one of the original stations on the North Auckland Line.
 1912: The present island platform and a new station building were constructed.
 1914: A signal box was established.
 1964: Lost much school traffic when some trains began to stop at St Peter's College (at the now closed Boston Road station and its replacement, the nearby Grafton station).
 1967: Following the introduction of centralised traffic control, the signal box was removed.
 Mid-1990s: The old station building was sold and removed, and is now located further up the track, past Morningside station, and is in use as a private home.
 2004: An upgraded station was opened.
 2019: An announcement that the station will be closed for four years from June 2020 for improvement as part of work for the City Rail Link starts.
 2020: Following a delay caused by the COVID-19 lockdown, Mt Eden Station closed on 11 July
 2023:The name of the station was officially changed from Mount Eden Station to Maungawhau Railway Station

City Rail Link 
Auckland Transport (AT) changed their City Rail Link plans by removing the proposed Newton station and instead adding another platform at Mount Eden with a trench-styled layout similar to New Lynn railway station. The benefit, according to the Mayor of Auckland Len Brown, was a saving of NZD$150 million. AT chairman Lester Levy said that there had been concerted effort to optimise the design and reduce construction cost. "The change that has resulted from this focus will reduce cost by removing the very deep Newton station, which will also reduce construction disruption in upper Symonds St by 12 to 18 months. The improved design will connect passengers at Mt Eden Station to the CRL which previously bypassed them and improve operation reliability through the provision of a separated east-west junction so train lines won’t need to cross over each other." Levy said the changes also will result in an improved customer experience with the CRL platform at Mount Eden to be built in a trench similar to the New Lynn station, and be open to the sky, rather than deep underground as was the case for the proposed Newton station location. This open air location and the separated train junction will also lower operating costs.

To allow the CRL to connect to the west toward Swanson and to the east toward Newmarket, Mount Eden station closed on 11 July 2020. The Western Line was realigned between Dominion Road and Mount Eden Prison, with consequent changes to overhead line and signalling systems.

In October 2019, demolition of 30 buildings in the station vicinity commenced. This first of three phases of demolition was expected to be completed in March 2020. The new station is currently under construction and is due to open in 2026.

Bus transfers 
Maungawhau Station is serviced by routes 64, 25B, 25L, 27H, 27W, and 27T services between central Auckland and Auckland Airport.

Signal box 
The Mt Eden Local Control Panel was installed in the station building in 1967 and removed from service in 1995 when the station building was removed. The panel has been preserved in working order.

See also 
 List of Auckland railway stations
 Public transport in Auckland

References

External links 
Photo of 1932 train at Mt Eden

Rail transport in Auckland
Railway stations in New Zealand
Railway stations opened in 1880
Buildings and structures in Auckland